This article lists of films produced by the Ollywood film industry and released in theaters in the year 2014. Premiere shows and film festival screenings are not considered as releases for this list.

Oriya Films

References 

2014
Ollywood
2014 in Odisha
Ollywood